Alfonso Negro (5 July 1915 – 7 November 1984) was an American-born Italian football (soccer) player, who played as a forward; he is believed to be the first American-born player in Serie A and the first American-born player to have played for Italy.

Club career
Born in Brooklyn, New York, Negro started his career with Angri in Serie C at the age of 15.  He moved onward to Catanzarese in Serie B. While at Catanzarese, he made his international debut with Italy B team against Hungary in Vercelli.

In 1934, he transferred to Fiorentina in Serie A. At that era, three other American-born players -- Armando Frigo, Alfio Argentieri and Umberto Piccolo—played in Italy at that time, but only Armando Frigo played in the Serie A.  Alfonso Negro played 51 games for Fiorentina, and scored five goals, before being transferred to Napoli in 1938, where he played 25 games and scored three goals.

International career
Negro was selected to play for Italy at the 1936 Olympic Games. He scored a goal against Norway and went on to win a gold medal in the tournament.

Education
Negro also entered university where he played for his school team. He graduated in medicine and surgery at Florence University and during the war served as a medical officer in Greece. Following the war he became a specialist in obstetrics and gynaecology and became a lecturer. He died in Florence, Italy on 7 November 1984.

Honours

International 
Italy
Olympic Gold Medal: 1936

References

Sources

External links 
 
 
 

1915 births
1984 deaths
Italian footballers
American expatriate soccer players
American emigrants to Italy
American people of Italian descent
Sportspeople from Brooklyn
Soccer players from New York City
Italy international footballers
Serie A players
ACF Fiorentina players
S.S.C. Napoli players
Olympic footballers of Italy
Olympic gold medalists for Italy
Footballers at the 1936 Summer Olympics
Olympic medalists in football
Medalists at the 1936 Summer Olympics
American soccer players
Association football forwards
Italian military personnel of World War II